Egin kantu! (in the Basque, "Sing!") was a television program, a musical talent show (reality television talent show), aired on EITB network from 2006 to 2010 and presented by Nerea Alias. A music talent contest with viewer voting and reality show elements, which aimed to find the country's next singing sensation.

The talent show was broadcast between 2006 and 2010, with good reception and audiences, being a successful format of EITB Media. It was one of EITB Media's most successful shows, having one of the highest audience rating shares of all time (a share of around 10% audience).

History 
It was a musical talent show (musical talent show), broadcast by the ETB1 network and distributed by EITB Media. The program was produced and directed by the film and television producer and founder of the production company Baleuko Eduardo Barinaga and co-directed by Lorea Perez de Albeniz. The main theme of Talent was Egin Kantu (song).

The program was broadcast between 2006 and 2010, with good reception and audiences, being a successful format for EITB Media.

The program began broadcasting in September 2006, on the ETB1 network. The presenter of the talent was Nerea Alias, during the four seasons of the program. The program ended after four seasons in 2010, which was the last broadcast of the contest.

The talent show was a pool of talents, from which several well-known singers and artists emerged later, such as María Ereña, Elene Arandia, Izar Algueró, Maialen Diez, ...

Format 
The format of the program followed a similar operation to others such as Star Academy, Operación Triunfo (OT), La Voz and others.

Contest participants had to first pass a selection audition where they were selected or not to participate. After that, already within the contest, the contestants were facing each other in different duels. The winners of each program were chosen by the public, who voted for their favorite singers. Thus, gala after gala and duel after duel until the winner or winners were known. In each program the contestants sang both songs in the Basque language and international successes and hits of the moment.

In each program the audience voted for their favorite candidate (public vote) until there was a winner.

To be contestants, the applicants had to overcome different phases of a casting to be able to be contestants on the program.

In each gala or episode of the program there was a guest participant (invited only in that episode, they were "Single-Day Guest Participant" or "Single-Episode Guest Participant"). After all the performances of the contestants in that gala or episode, the invited participant sang a song, while the public voted for the contestants and the public vote was counted.

Program products 

As the talent show was one of EITB Media's most successful shows, many were the products and merchandising that came out of it. Among the published products are, among others, the official CD with songs from the program, the official DVD with the episodes of the program or the official CD-DVD with a karaoke of the program.

Music band 
The official CD of the program was recorded by the winners of the program (official music band of the program): Maialen Diez, Oihan Larraza, Beñat Urkiola and Ane Gonzalez. In addition, on one of their albums, they had the collaboration of the singer and former member of the music band Betizu Taldea Telmo Idígoras.

The music band formed by Maialen Diez, Oihan Larraza, Beñat Urkiola and Ane Gonzalez (Egin Kantu music band) replaced the musical band Betizu Taldea (2002-2006).

In addition, another of the products of the talent show was the concerts of Egin kantu!. The band formed by the four winners of the program gave different concerts throughout the Basque Country, singing the official songs of the program.

Professional team 
The program had a team of professional teachers and coaches. The vocal coach of the was Joxe Mendizabal and the dance teacher and choreographer was Naiara Santacoloma.

After overcoming all the casting phases, the contestants prepared each of their actions previously with various classes and essays of voice and song and dance.

Participants (contestants) 
Among the participants (contestants) who have participated in Egin Kantu! in any of the editions or seasons are, among others: María Ereña, Elene Arandia, Izar Algueró, Maialen Diez, Beñat Urkiola, Oihan Larraza, Ane González, Ainhoa Nieto, Andoni Polo, Ixone Andreu, Naroa Merino, Unai Miranda, Silvia Raya, Ukerdi Arrondo, Leire Garijo, Irati Echarri, Naiara Urresti, Maialen Urbieta, Ernesto Garitaonandia, ...

Culture impact 
The Egin kantu! contest was a success for the vast majority of the generation of children born in the 90s. Its long duration (2006-2010) and its high audience rating shares made it very popular and well-known in the Basque Country and Navarra, being a well-known audiovisual product.

Some examples of its cultural impact, visibles on the social network Twitter, among others:

See also 

 Nerea Alias
 Betizu
 Operación Triunfo (Spanish TV series)
 Star Academy

References

External links 

Spanish music television series
EITB original programming